Custer's Trials: A Life on the Frontier of a New America is a book by T. J. Stiles. It  won the 2016 Pulitzer Prize for History.

References 

Pulitzer Prize for History-winning works
George Armstrong Custer